David Michael Daniel (born August 20, 1960) is an American poet. Best known for two full-length volumes of his poetry, Seven-Star Bird and Ornaments. Daniel is the creator and producer of WAMFEST: The Words and Music Festival which he founded in 2007. He is an associate professor of creative writing at Fairleigh Dickinson University where the festival is held.

Early life and education
Daniel was born in Danville, Kentucky on August 20, 1960, and lived in Louisiana and North Carolina before his family settled in Murfreesboro, Tennessee, when he was 10 years old. Daniel earned a Bachelor of Arts degree from Vanderbilt University with a double major in English and Philosophy in 1982. The following year, he received a Master of Arts degree from Johns Hopkins University in their Writing Seminars program. Then in 1986, he earned a Master of Fine Arts degree in Creative Writing from the University of Virginia where he was a Henry Hoynes Fellow.

Ploughshares and other literary journals
In 1987, Daniel became the editor of AWP Chronicle (now known as The Writer’s Chronicle). The following year after moving to Cambridge, Mass., he became the associate editor of the Harvard Book Review and around the same time, joined the editorial staff of Ploughshares. He became the poetry editor for the latter literary journal in 1992, a post he held for 15 years. In 2007, he became the co-poetry editor of The Literary Review, as well as a member of its board of directors, positions he held until 2012.

Published Works
Daniel’s poems have been published in numerous magazines and literary journals, most notably  in American Poetry Review, The Literary Review, The Antioch Review, Poetry East and AGNI. His essay, “Thoughts on ‘Me and Bobby McGee’ and the Oral and Literary Traditions,” was published in The Poetics of American Song Lyrics, edited by Charlotte Pence. Another of his essays, “Discovering the Prose Poem in Norfolk, Virginia,” was included in The Rose Metal Press Field Guide to Prose Poetry: Contemporary Poets in Discussion and Practice, edited by Gary L. McDowell and F. Daniel Rzicznek. Daniel also has had a large number of poetry and book reviews published, most notably in Ploughshares, Harvard Book Review and The Journal of Country Music.

The Quick and the Dead
The Quick and the Dead, a chapbook of Daniel’s poetry was published by Haw River Press in 1992.

Seven-Star Bird
Daniel’s first full-length poetry collection, Seven-Star Bird, was published by Graywolf Press in 2003. In 2004, the book was awarded the Larry Levis Reading Prize. One of the most prestigious awards of its kind, it is given to the best first or second book of poems published in the year. 

After reading Seven-Star Bird, legendary literary critic Harold Bloom called Daniel “an authentic heir of Hart Crane” and included a lengthy excerpt from the book in the 2006 anthology he edited, The Library of America: Anthology of American Religious Poetry. Poet Tom Sleigh also referenced Crane in regards to the book, writing, “Like Hart Crane in ‘The Bridge’, David Daniel has a vision of desire that is transcendental, but also social, that links erotic and domestic love with love of the divine.”

Ornaments
Daniel’s second full-length book of poetry, Ornaments, was published by the University of Pittsburgh Press in 2017 as part of the highly regarded Pitt Poetry Series.

Teaching and Union Activity
In 1989, Daniel joined the faculty of Emerson College in Boston as an adjunct professor in the Department of Writing, Literature and Publishing, a position he held until 2004. During his time at Emerson, Daniel co-founded and was the first president of the part-time faculty union, the Affiliated Faculty of Emerson College. Part-time faculty made up 75 percent of the school’s faculty at the time, and the AFEC was the first independent part-time faculty union in the East. Daniel led the AFEC negotiating team which produced the union’s first contract with the school administration in 2004. In 2005, Daniel became a professor and the director of the undergraduate Creative Writing program at Fairleigh Dickinson University, where he is also on the faculty of the school’s low residency creative writing MFA. From 2012 to 2016, Daniel was a member of the core faculty of Bennington College’s Writing Seminars MFA program.

Honors, Awards and Professional Service
In 2004, Daniel received the Larry Levis Reading Prize, an award given to the best first or second book of poems published in the year, for his book Seven-Star Bird.

Daniel was a featured poet at the Geraldine R. Dodge Poetry Festival in 2014.

That same year he was the recipient of the Massachusetts Cultural Council Artist Fellowship in Poetry.

Also in 2014, Daniel became a member of the Cambridge Arts Council’s advisory board, a position he still holds.

References 

Living people
1960 births
20th-century American poets